Buzzard Flapper Creek is a stream in the U.S. state of Georgia. It is a tributary to Smithwick Creek.

Buzzard Flapper Creek most likely was named after a Cherokee tribesman who settled nearby. A variant name is "Buzzard Flopper Creek".

References

Rivers of Georgia (U.S. state)
Rivers of Cherokee County, Georgia